DeMars (and variants) is a surname. Notable people with the surname include:

 AnnMaria De Mars (born 1958), American technology executive, author and Judoka
 Billy DeMars (1925–2020), American baseball shortstop and coach
 Bruce DeMars, United States Navy four star admiral
 Hélène-Louise Demars (born c. 1736), French composer
 Jean-Odéo Demars (1695–1756), French organist and harpsichordist
 Lina van de Mars (born 1979), German TV moderator
 Nicole Demars (born 1970), Canadian road cyclist
 Vernon DeMars (1908–2005), American architect and professor

See also
DeMar